Politehnica Iași is an amateur rugby union club in Romania, based in the city of Iași which plays in the Liga Națională de Rugby.

Honours

Romania
SuperLiga CEC Bank:
Third place (1): 2000

Cupa României:
Winners (2): 1979, 2003
Runners-up (1): 1988

Moldova
Cupa Moldovei:
Winners (1): 1968

Former squad

External links
 itsrugby.co.uk Squad Details
 PlanetaOvala.ro - Romanian Rugby News

Romanian rugby union teams
Rugby clubs established in 1969
Sport in Iași
1952 establishments in Romania